In 1828, Gomdhar Konwar (Assamese: গোমধৰ কোঁৱৰ), a prince of the Ahom royal family, his colleague Dhanjay Borgohain and their followers rose in revolt against the British occupation of Assam.

By end of 1828 the process extension of British dominion into Assam was completed. With the assumption of the political power by the officers of the East India Company, the ruling Ahom monarchy lost not only their political authority but social privileges too. The feudal structure of the society began to crumble as new measures were adopted by the colonial rulers to strip the nobility of their rights and privileges. Their enthusiasm for their new friend, who aided them in driving out the Burmese from Assam, soon disappeared and supporters of monarchy began to organize themselves to restore the old Ahom monarchy and oust the British.

Gomdhar was formally enthroned near Jorhat according to Ahom rites, and arms and ammunitions were collected. But before he could make much headway a counter offensive was made by the British led by Lieutenant Rutherford.  The rebels lost and Gomdhar fled to the Naga Hills. But, soon he and his associates were arrested by the British. Gomdhar was found guilty of “illegally assuming the Insignia of Royalty” and sentenced to death. This sentence was subsequently commuted to seven years of imprisonment in banishment and was deported to an unknown location to die in ignominy.

References

Further reading
 Baruah S.L., A Comprehensive History of Assam, p. 465>Baruah S.L., A Comprehensive History of Assam, p. 465
 Tamuli, L. Bharotor Swadhinata Sangramat Asomar Abadan. pp 14–15

People of the Ahom kingdom
19th-century Indian royalty
Year of birth missing
Year of death missing
Ahom kingdom